Khorasanlu may refer to:
 Khorasanlu, East Azerbaijan
 Khorasanlu, Zanjan